Mobile Crisis, or Mobile Crisis Rapid Response Team (MCRRT), is a mental health service in the United States and Canada (typically operated by  hospital or community mental health agency) which services the community by providing immediate response emergency mental health evaluations. Evaluations are often requested by hospital emergency rooms, but can also be requested by ICUs, CCUs, jails, nursing homes, police, or EMS. These services are often available on a 24-hour basis.

Mobile Crisis evaluations are typically requested due to a reasonable expectation of self-inflicted harm to the client, but can also be requested due to a reasonable expectation of the client's intent to harm another person. In addition to Suicidal/Homicidal Ideation or gestures, an assessment may be requested due to a person exhibiting signs of psychosis, grave alien, or altered mental status believed not to have an organic etiology. Criteria for requesting a Mobile Crisis assessment varies depending upon individual mental health agencies and entities that regulate mental health services, as well as statues created via legislative assemblies. An assessment may be requested for situations involving alcohol and drugs (where there is not a mental health component), or "routine" evaluations requested where there is not a reasonable expectation of harm to the client or another individual, as long as psychopathology is not otherwise ruled out.

The Mobile Crisis clinician has typically obtained her/his Master's degree in a mental health-related field (such as social work, mental health counseling, or counseling psychology). The clinician performs the evaluation based on standard models of mental status examination (alert and oriented, mood, thought process, affect, etc.), and assigns a DSM-5 (Diagnostic and Statistical Manual of the American Psychiatric Association, Fifth Edition) diagnosis if this falls within their scope of practice.  After completing the evaluation, the clinician makes a disposition, or placement, decision for the client. Placements can include involuntary in-patient hospitalization, voluntary in-patient hospitalization, or discharge to home with out-patient referrals. Following disposition, the Mobile Crisis unit can be expected to follow up with the client within a few days.

External links
http://dhss.delaware.gov/dhss/dsamh/crisis_intervention.html

New York City Mobile Crisis Team

Mental health in the United States